Yevsevyevo is the name of several rural localities in Russia.

Modern localities
Yevsevyevo, Danilovsky District, Yaroslavl Oblast, a village in Semlovsky Rural Okrug of Danilovsky District in Yaroslavl Oblast
Yevsevyevo, Poshekhonsky District, Yaroslavl Oblast, a village in Voshchikovsky Rural Okrug of Poshekhonsky District in Yaroslavl Oblast

Alternative names
Yevsevyevo, alternative name of Yevseyevo, a village in Ulitinskoye Rural Settlement of Pavlovo-Posadsky District in Moscow Oblast;

See also
Yevsevyev, Russian last name